Diaphania infimalis is a moth in the family Crambidae. It was first described by Achille Guenée in 1854. It is found in Florida, Mexico, Guatemala, Belize, the Bahamas, Cuba, Jamaica, Panama, Venezuela and Bolivia.

The length of the forewings is 9–10 mm for males and 9–11 mm for females. The external brown band on the forewings is extended into the anal margin. The width of the costal and external brown bands is variable. The hindwing have a similar brown coloration and the width of the external band is also variable as on the forewings.

The larvae have been recorded feeding on Melothria grendula.

References

Diaphania
Moths described in 1854
Moths of North America
Moths of South America
Taxa named by Achille Guenée